Citibank House is an 18-storey office building in Perth, Western Australia. The  building was opened in 1962 as the T & G Building, and was the tallest building in Perth until 1970 when Hamersley House was opened. It underwent a major refurbishment in the 1980s which significantly altered the building's external features. The building adopted its current name when Citibank became its flagship tenant. As of December 2008, the tower is the 26th-tallest completed building in Perth.

Site history and construction 
The site at the corner of St Georges Terrace and Barrack Street was occupied by hostelries from the colony's earliest days, and later housed the Weld Club.

During the Western Australian gold rush in 1897, the Moir Building was constructed on the site. Designed by Talbot Hobbs, the building was one of the most well-known buildings in Perth at the time. It later became the headquarters for the T & G Mutual Life Assurance Society and was renamed to the T & G Chambers. The southern end of the site was also home to the McNeil Chambers.

New T & G Building 
Growth in T & G's business, coupled with a desire for a modern tower, led to the decision to demolish the iconic chambers. The original T & G Chambers were demolished in early 1960, and excavation for the new tower's foundation began in June 1960.

The high water table of the site necessitated the use of a raft-type foundation. After this, a  concrete retaining wall was poured around the basement levels and the steel frame of the building was erected. The floors of the building were formed by attaching permanent galvanised iron formwork to the steel frame, adding steel reinforcement mesh and pouring  of concrete on top.

The building was the tallest in Perth upon its completion.

Design 
The T&G Building was designed by architects Forbes & Fitzhardinge.

The service tower on the building's west side housed the tower's services, including its four high-speed lifts, a lift lobby, electricity, plumbing, toilets, tea room and two escape stairwells.

The building is of a steel frame construction, clad with aluminium, glass and precast aggregate concrete panels. The building is supported by 32 steel columns. The ground floor was clad with black polished granite, and the lobby featured Travertine marble.

The "fully automatic" lifts which were installed in the building were the most advanced in Australia.

A  steel flag pole (incorporating a lightning conductor) was placed on the northern end of the service tower.

Refurbishment 
When the T & G Building was constructed, there were no plot ratio limits imposed by the City of Perth on multistorey developments, and the building had a plot ratio of approximately 7:1. However, subsequent to the construction, a limit of 5:1 was imposed. As a result, in the 1980s when the tower was already outdated and showing signs of age, the owners found that they would be unable to replace the tower with a new one of a similar size. As a result, a decision was made to extensively refurbish the building.

The roof of the building, which previously featured a small caretaker's flat, was fully enclosed as an extra office floor. Above this, a facade was added bringing all sides of the building to the top of the mechanical penthouse which previously rose several floors above the roof. The window shades above every floor were enlarged and extended outwards from the building, and all window glass was replaced.

Gallery

Notes

References 
  ("Progress Bulletin")

External links 
 Photographs of the tower and the Old T & G Building in the State Library of Western Australia Pictorial Collection
 Emporis page on the tower

Office buildings completed in 1962
Office buildings in Perth, Western Australia
St Georges Terrace
Citigroup buildings